Nikolay Semyonovich Zimyatov (born 28 June 1955), is a Soviet and Russian cross-country skier. He was the first man in the sport to win three gold medals at a single Winter Olympics, in the 30 km, 50 km and 4 × 10 km relay at the 1980 Lake Placid Games. In the 50 km race he finished two and half minutes ahead of the second place. He also won the 30 km event at the 1984 Winter Olympics in Sarajevo and was awarded Order of Friendship of Peoples that year.

At the world championships Zimyatov won only one medal, a silver over 30 km in 1978. Nationally he collected four Soviet titles: in the 30 km and 4 × 10 km relay in 1978, and in the 15 and 30 km in 1979. After retiring from competitions he had a long career as a cross-country skiing coach and prepared the Russian team for the 2002 Olympics. In 1980 he married a fellow international skier Lyubov Sykova.

Cross-country skiing results
All results are sourced from the International Ski Federation (FIS).

Olympic Games
 5 medals – (4 gold, 1 silver)

World Championships
 1 medal – (1 silver)

World Cup

Season standings

Individual podiums
2 victories 
2 podiums

Team podiums
 1 podium

Note:  Until the 1994 Olympics, Olympic races were included in the World Cup scoring system.

References

External links

 Biography and photos

1955 births
Living people
Olympic cross-country skiers of the Soviet Union
Olympic gold medalists for the Soviet Union
Olympic silver medalists for the Soviet Union
Soviet male cross-country skiers
Spartak athletes
Russian male cross-country skiers
Cross-country skiers at the 1980 Winter Olympics
Cross-country skiers at the 1984 Winter Olympics
Honoured Masters of Sport of the USSR
Recipients of the Order of Friendship of Peoples
Recipients of the Order of the Red Banner of Labour
Olympic medalists in cross-country skiing
FIS Nordic World Ski Championships medalists in cross-country skiing
Medalists at the 1984 Winter Olympics
Medalists at the 1980 Winter Olympics